Sir Isaiah Berlin  (6 June 1909 – 5 November 1997) was a Russian-British social and political theorist, philosopher, and historian of ideas. Although he became increasingly averse to writing for publication, his improvised lectures and talks were sometimes recorded and transcribed, and many of his spoken words were converted into published essays and books, both by himself and by others, especially his principal editor from 1974, Henry Hardy.

Born in Riga (now the capital of Latvia, then a part of the Russian Empire) in 1909, he moved to Petrograd, Russia, at the age of six, where he witnessed the revolutions of 1917. In 1921 his family moved to the UK, and he was educated at St Paul's School, London, and Corpus Christi College, Oxford. In 1932, at the age of twenty-three, Berlin was elected to a prize fellowship at All Souls College, Oxford. In addition to his own prolific output, he translated works by Ivan Turgenev from Russian into English and, during World War II, worked for the British Diplomatic Service. From 1957 to 1967 he was Chichele Professor of Social and Political Theory at the University of Oxford. He was president of the Aristotelian Society from 1963 to 1964. In 1966, he played a critical role in creating Wolfson College, Oxford, and became its founding President. Berlin was appointed a CBE in 1946, knighted in 1957, and appointed to the Order of Merit in 1971. He was President of the British Academy from 1974 to 1978. He also received the 1979 Jerusalem Prize for his lifelong defence of civil liberties, and on 25 November 1994 he received the honorary degree of Doctor of Laws at the University of Toronto, for which occasion he prepared a "short credo" (as he called it in a letter to a friend), now known as "A Message to the Twenty-First Century", to be read on his behalf at the ceremony.

An annual Isaiah Berlin Lecture is held at the Hampstead Synagogue, at Wolfson College, Oxford, at the British Academy, and in Riga. Berlin's work on liberal theory and on value pluralism, as well as his opposition to Marxism and communism, has had a lasting influence.

Early life 

Berlin was born on 6 June 1909 into a wealthy Jewish family, the only son of Mendel Berlin, a timber trader (and a direct descendant of Shneur Zalman, founder of Chabad Hasidism), and his wife Marie, née Volshonok. His family owned a timber company, one of the largest in the Baltics, as well as forests in Russia, from where the timber was floated down the Daugava river to its sawmills in Riga. As his father, who was the head of the Riga Association of Timber Merchants, worked for the company in its dealings with Western companies, he was fluent not only in Yiddish, Russian and German, but also French and English. His Russian-speaking mother, Marie (Musya) Volshonok, was also fluent in Yiddish and Latvian. Isaiah Berlin spent his first six years in Riga, and later lived in Andreapol (a small timber town near Pskov, effectively owned by the family business) and Petrograd (now St Petersburg). In Petrograd, the family lived first on Vasilevsky Island and then on Angliiskii Prospekt on the mainland. On Angliiskii Prospekt, they shared their building with other tenants, including Rimsky-Korsakov's daughter, an assistant Minister of Finnish affairs and Princess Emeretinsky. With the onset of the October Revolution of 1917, the fortunes of the building's tenants were rapidly reversed, with both the Princess Emeretinsky and Rimsky-Korsakov's daughter soon being made to stoke the building's stoves and sweep the yards. Berlin witnessed the February and October Revolutions both from his apartment windows and from walks in the city with his governess, where he recalled the crowds of protesters marching on the Winter Palace Square.

One particular childhood memory of the February Revolution marked his life-long opposition to violence, with Berlin saying:

Feeling increasingly oppressed by life under Bolshevik rule where the family was identified as bourgeoisie, the family left Petrograd, on 5 October 1920, for Riga, but encounters with anti-Semitism and difficulties with the Latvian authorities convinced them to leave, and they moved to Britain in early 1921 (Mendel in January, Isaiah and Marie at the beginning of February), when Berlin was eleven. In London, the family first stayed in Surbiton where he was sent to Arundel House for preparatory school, then within the year they bought a house in Kensington, and six years later in Hampstead.

Berlin's native language was Russian, and his English was virtually nonexistent at first, but he reached proficiency in English within a year at around the age of 12. In addition to Russian and English, Berlin was fluent in French, German and Italian, and knew Hebrew, Latin, and Ancient Greek. Despite his fluency in English, however, in later life Berlin's Oxford English accent would sound increasingly Russian in its vowel sounds. Whenever he was described as an English philosopher, Berlin always insisted that he was not an English philosopher, but would forever be a Russian Jew: "I am a Russian Jew from Riga, and all my years in England cannot change this. I love England, I have been well treated here, and I cherish many things about English life, but I am a Russian Jew; that is how I was born and that is who I will be to the end of my life."<ref>Dubnov A.M. (2012) "Becoming a Russian-Jew". In: Isaiah Berlin. Palgrave Studies in Cultural and Intellectual History'. Palgrave Macmillan, New York</ref>

 Education 
Berlin was educated at St Paul's School in London. According to Michael Bonavia, a British author who was at school with him, he

After leaving St Paul's, Berlin applied to Balliol College, Oxford, but was denied admission after a chaotic interview. Berlin decided to apply again, only to a different college: Corpus Christi College, Oxford. Berlin was admitted and commenced his literae humaniores degree. He graduated in 1928, taking first-class honours in his final examinations and winning the John Locke Prize for his performance in the philosophy papers, in which he outscored A. J. Ayer. He subsequently took another degree at Oxford in philosophy, politics and economics, again taking first-class honours after less than a year on the course. He was appointed a tutor in philosophy at New College, Oxford, and soon afterwards was elected to a prize fellowship at All Souls College, Oxford, the first unconverted Jew to achieve this fellowship at All Souls.

While still a student, he befriended Ayer (with whom he was to share a lifelong amicable rivalry), Stuart Hampshire, Richard Wollheim, Maurice Bowra, Roy Beddington, Stephen Spender, Inez Pearn, J. L. Austin and Nicolas Nabokov. In 1940, he presented a philosophical paper on other minds to a meeting attended by Ludwig Wittgenstein at Cambridge University. Wittgenstein rejected the argument of his paper in discussion but praised Berlin for his intellectual honesty and integrity. Berlin was to remain at Oxford for the rest of his life, apart from a period working for British Information Services (BIS) in New York from 1940 to 1942 and for the British embassies in Washington, DC, and Moscow from then until 1946. Before crossing the Atlantic in 1940, Berlin took rest in Portugal for a few days. He stayed in Estoril, at the Hotel Palácio, between 19 and 24 October 1940. Prior to this service, however, Berlin was barred from participation in the British war effort as a result of his being born in Latvia, and because his left arm had been damaged at birth. In April 1943 he wrote a confidential analysis of members of the Senate Foreign Relations Committee for the Foreign Office; he described Senator Arthur Capper from Kansas as a solid, stolid, 78-year-old reactionary from the corn belt, who is the very voice of Mid-Western "grass root" isolationism.
For his services, he was appointed a CBE in the 1946 New Year Honours. Meetings with Anna Akhmatova in Leningrad in November 1945 and January 1946 had a powerful effect on both of them, and serious repercussions for Akhmatova (who immortalised the meetings in her poetry).

 Personal life 
In 1956 Berlin married Aline Elisabeth Yvonne Halban, née de Gunzbourg (1915–2014), the former wife of nuclear physicist  Hans Halban, and a former winner of the ladies' golf championship of France. She was from an exiled half Russian-aristocratic and half ennobled-Jewish banking and petroleum family (her mother was Yvonne Deutsch de la Meurthe, granddaughter of Henri Deutsch de la Meurthe) based in Paris.

He was elected a Foreign Honorary Member of the American Academy of Arts and Sciences in 1959, and a member of the American Philosophical Society in 1975. He was instrumental in the founding, in 1966, of a new graduate college at Oxford University: Wolfson College. The college was founded to be a centre of academic excellence which, unlike many other colleges at Oxford, would also be based on a strong egalitarian and democratic ethos. Berlin was a member of the Founding Council of the Rothermere American Institute at Oxford University. As later revealed, when he was asked to evaluate the academic credentials of Isaac Deutscher, Isaiah Berlin argued against a promotion, because of the profoundly pro-communist militancy of the candidate.

Berlin died in Oxford on 5 November 1997, aged 88. He is buried there in Wolvercote Cemetery. On his death, the obituarist of The Independent wrote: "he was a man of formidable intellectual power with a rare gift for understanding a wide range of human motives, hopes and fears, and a prodigiously energetic capacity for enjoyment – of life, of people in all their variety, of their ideas and idiosyncrasies, of literature, of music, of art". The same publication reported: "Isaiah Berlin was often described, especially in his old age, by means of superlatives: the world's greatest talker, the century's most inspired reader, one of the finest minds of our time. There is no doubt that he showed in more than one direction the unexpectedly large possibilities open to us at the top end of the range of human potential." The front page of The New York Times concluded: "His was an exuberant life crowded with joys – the joy of thought, the joy of music, the joy of good friends. ... The theme that runs throughout his work is his concern with liberty and the dignity of human beings .... Sir Isaiah radiated well-being."

Thought

 Lecturing and composition 
Berlin did not enjoy writing, and his published work (including both his essays and books) was produced by means of conversational dictation to a tape-recorder, or through the transcription of his improvised lectures and talks from recorded tapes. The work of transcribing his spoken word often placed a strain on his secretaries. This method of dictation even extended to his letters, which were produced by speaking to a Grundig tape recorder, often while simultaneously in conversation with his friends, and then transcribed with difficulty by his secretary, who at times would inadvertently include his jokes and laughter into the transcribed text itself. The results are a darting and leaping style of thought, which literally reflected his own conversation, and the ornate grammar and punctuation which was contained in his everyday speech.

"Two Concepts of Liberty"

Berlin is known for his inaugural lecture, "Two Concepts of Liberty," delivered in 1958 as Chichele Professor of Social and Political Theory at Oxford. The lecture, later published as an essay, reintroduced the study of political philosophy to the methods of analytic philosophy. Berlin defined 'negative liberty' as absence of coercion or interference of private actions by an external political body, which Berlin derived from the Hobbesian definition of liberty. 'Positive liberty' Berlin maintained, could be thought of as self-mastery, which asks not what we are free from, but what we are free to do. Berlin contended that modern political thinkers often conflated positive liberty with rational action, based upon a rational knowledge to which, it is argued, only a certain elite or social group has access. This rationalist conflation was open to political abuses, which encroached on negative liberty, when such interpretations of positive liberty were, in the nineteenth century, used to defend nationalism, paternalism, social engineering, historicism, and collective rational control over human destiny.

 Counter-Enlightenment 

Berlin's lectures on the Enlightenment and its critics (especially Giambattista Vico, Johann Gottfried Herder, Joseph de Maistre and Johann Georg Hamann, to whose views Berlin referred as the Counter-Enlightenment) contributed to his advocacy of an irreducibly pluralist ethical ontology. In Three Critics of the Enlightenment, Berlin argues that Hamann was one of the first thinkers to conceive of human cognition as language – the articulation and use of symbols. Berlin saw Hamann as having recognised as the rationalist's Cartesian fallacy the notion that there are "clear and distinct" ideas "which can be contemplated by a kind of inner eye", without the use of language – a recognition greatly sharpened in the 20th century by Wittgenstein's private language argument.

 Value pluralism 

For Berlin, values are creations of mankind, rather than products of nature waiting to be discovered. He argued, on the basis of the epistemic and empathetic access we have to other cultures across history, that the nature of mankind is such that certain values – the importance of individual liberty, for instance – will hold true across cultures, and this is what he meant by objective pluralism. Berlin's argument was partly grounded in Wittgenstein's later theory of language, which argued that inter-translatability was supervenient on a similarity in forms of life, with the inverse implication that our epistemic access to other cultures entails an ontologically contiguous value-structure. With his account of value pluralism, he proposed the view that moral values may be equally, or rather incommensurably, valid and yet incompatible, and may, therefore, come into conflict with one another in a way that admits of no resolution without reference to particular contexts of a decision. When values clash, it may not be that one is more important than the other: keeping a promise may conflict with the pursuit of truth; liberty may clash with social justice. Moral conflicts are "an intrinsic, irremovable element in human life". "These collisions of values are of the essence of what they are and what we are." For Berlin, this clashing of incommensurate values within, no less than between, individuals, constitutes the tragedy of human life. Alan Brown suggests, however, that Berlin ignores the fact that values are commensurable in the extent to which they contribute to the human good.

"The Hedgehog and the Fox"

"The Hedgehog and the Fox", a title referring to a fragment of the ancient Greek poet Archilochus, was one of Berlin's most popular essays with the general public, reprinted in numerous editions. Of the classification that gives the essay its title, Berlin once said "I never meant it very seriously. I meant it as a kind of enjoyable intellectual game, but it was taken seriously."

Berlin expands upon this idea to divide writers and thinkers into two categories: hedgehogs, who view the world through the lens of a single defining idea (examples given include Plato), and foxes, who draw on a wide variety of experiences and for whom the world cannot be boiled down to a single idea (examples given include William Shakespeare: "There are more things in heaven and earth, Horatio, Than are dreamt of in your philosophy". Hamlet 1.5 167–168).

Positive liberty
Berlin promoted the notion of "positive liberty" in the sense of an intrinsic link between positive freedom and participatory, Athenian-style, democracy. There is a contrast with "negative liberty." Liberals in the English-speaking tradition call for negative liberty, meaning a realm of private autonomy from which the state is legally excluded. In contrast French liberals ever since the French Revolution more often promote "positive liberty"that is, liberty insofar as it is tethered to collectively defined ends. They praise the state as an essential tool to emancipate the people.Steven J. Heyman, "Positive and negative liberty." Chicago-Kent Law Review. 68 (1992): 81–90.  online

Other work
Berlin's lecture "Historical Inevitability" (1954) focused on a controversy in the philosophy of history. Given the choice, whether one believes that "the lives of entire peoples and societies have been decisively influenced by exceptional individuals" or, conversely, that whatever happens occurs as a result of impersonal forces oblivious to human intentions, Berlin rejected both options and the choice itself as nonsensical. Berlin is also well known for his writings on Russian intellectual history, most of which are collected in Russian Thinkers (1978; 2nd ed. 2008) and edited, as most of Berlin's work, by Henry Hardy (in the case of this volume, jointly with Aileen Kelly). Berlin also contributed a number of essays on leading intellectuals and political figures of his time, including Winston Churchill, Franklin Delano Roosevelt, and Chaim Weizmann. Eighteen of these character sketches were published together as "Personal Impressions" (1980; 2nd ed., with four additional essays, 1998; 3rd ed., with a further ten essays, 2014).

Commemoration
A number of commemorative events for Isaiah Berlin are held at Oxford University, as well as scholarships given out in his name, including the Wolfson Isaiah Berlin Clarendon Scholarship, The Isaiah Berlin Visiting Professorship, and the annual Isaiah Berlin Lectures. The Berlin Quadrangle of Wolfson College, Oxford, is named after him. The Isaiah Berlin Association of Latvia was founded in 2011 to promote the ideas and values of Sir Isaiah Berlin, in particular by organising an annual Isaiah Berlin day and lectures in his memory. At the British Academy, the Isaiah Berlin lecture series has been held since 2001. Many volumes from Berlin's personal library were donated to Ben-Gurion University of the Negev in Beer Sheva and form part of the Aranne Library collection. The Isaiah Berlin Room, on the third floor of the library, is a replica of his study at the University of Oxford. There is also the Isaiah Berlin Society which takes place at his alma mater of St Paul's School. The society invites world famous academics to share their research into the answers to life's great concerns and to respond to students' questions. In the last few years they have hosted: A.C. Grayling, Brad Hooker, Jonathan Dancy, John Cottingham, Tim Crane, Arif Ahmed, Hugh Mellor and David Papineau.

Published works
Apart from Unfinished Dialogue, all books/editions listed from 1978 onwards are edited (or, where stated, co-edited) by Henry Hardy, and all but Karl Marx are compilations or transcripts of lectures, essays, and letters. Details given are of first and latest UK editions, and current US editions. Most titles are also available as e-books. The twelve titles marked with a '+' are available in the US market in revised editions from Princeton University Press, with additional material by Berlin, and (except in the case of Karl Marx) new forewords by contemporary authors; the 5th edition of Karl Marx is also available in the UK.
 +Karl Marx: His Life and Environment, Thornton Butterworth, 1939. 5th ed., Karl Marx, 2013, Princeton University Press. .
 The Age of Enlightenment: The Eighteenth-Century Philosophers, New American Library, 1956. Out of print. Second edition (2017) available online only.
 +The Hedgehog and the Fox: An Essay on Tolstoy's View of History, Weidenfeld & Nicolson, London, 1953. 2nd ed., 2014, Phoenix. . 2nd US ed., Princeton University Press, 2013. .
 Four Essays on Liberty, Oxford University Press, 1969. Superseded by Liberty.
 Vico and Herder: Two Studies in the History of Ideas, Chatto and Windus, 1976. Superseded by Three Critics of the Enlightenment.
 Russian Thinkers (edited by Henry Hardy and Aileen Kelly), Hogarth Press, 1978. 2nd ed. (revised by Henry Hardy), Penguin, 2008. .
 +Concepts and Categories: Philosophical Essays, Hogarth Press, 1978. Pimlico. . 2nd ed., 2013, Princeton University Press. .
 +Against the Current: Essays in the History of Ideas, Hogarth Press, 1979. Pimlico. . 2nd ed., 2013, Princeton University Press.
 +Personal Impressions, Hogarth Press, 1980. 2nd ed., Pimlico, 1998. . 3rd ed., 2014, Princeton University Press. .
 +The Crooked Timber of Humanity: Chapters in the History of Ideas, John Murray, 1990. 2nd ed., Pimlico, 2013. . 2nd ed., 2013, Princeton University Press. .
 The Magus of the North: J. G. Hamann and the Origins of Modern Irrationalism, John Murray, 1993. Superseded by Three Critics of the Enlightenment.
 +The Sense of Reality: Studies in Ideas and their History, Chatto & Windus, 1996. Pimlico. . 2nd ed., 2019, Princeton University Press. .
 The Proper Study of Mankind: An Anthology of Essays (edited by Henry Hardy and Roger Hausheer) [a one-volume selection from the whole of Berlin's work], Chatto & Windus, 1997. 2nd ed., Vintage, 2013. .
 +The Roots of Romanticism (lectures delivered in 1965), Chatto & Windus, 1999. [imlico. . 2nd ed., 2013, Princeton University Press. .
 +Three Critics of the Enlightenment: Vico, Hamann, Herder, Pimlico, 2000. 2nd ed., 2013. . 2nd ed., 2013, Princeton University Press. .
 +The Power of Ideas, Chatto & Windus, 2000. Pimlico. . 2nd ed., 2013, Princeton University Press. .
 +Freedom and Its Betrayal: Six Enemies of Human Liberty (lectures delivered in 1952), Chatto & Windus, 2002. Pimlico. . 2nd ed., 2014, Princeton University Press. .
 Liberty [revised and expanded edition of Four Essays on Liberty], Oxford University Press, 2002. .
 The Soviet Mind: Russian Culture under Communism, Brookings Institution Press, 2004. . 2nd ed., Brookings Classics, 2016. .
 Flourishing: Letters 1928–1946, Chatto & Windus, 2004. Pimlico. .
 +Political Ideas in the Romantic Age: Their Rise and Influence on Modern Thought (1952), Chatto & Windus, 2006. . Pimlico, . 2nd ed., 2014, Princeton University Press. .
 (with Beata Polanowska-Sygulska) Unfinished Dialogue, Prometheus, 2006. .
 Enlightening: Letters 1946–1960 (edited by Henry Hardy and Jennifer Holmes), Chatto & Windus, 2009. . Pimlico, .
 Building: Letters 1960–1975 (edited by Henry Hardy and Mark Pottle), Chatto & Windus, 2013. .
 Affirming: Letters 1975–1997 (edited by Henry Hardy and Mark Pottle), Chatto & Windus, 2015. .

See also
 Gerald C. MacCallum Jr.

References

Sources
  Authorised biography.

Further reading

Books
 Baum, Bruce and Robert Nichols, eds. Isaiah Berlin and the Politics of Freedom: 'Two Concepts of Liberty' 50 Years Later, (Routledge, 2013).
 Benhabib, Seyla. Exile, Statelessness, and Migration: Playing Chess with History from Hannah Arendt to Isaiah Berlin (Princeton University Press, 2018)
 Blattberg, Charles. From Pluralist to Patriotic Politics: Putting Practice First, Oxford and New York: Oxford University Press, 2000. . A critique of Berlin's value pluralism. Blattberg has also criticised Berlin for taking politics "too seriously."
 Brockliss, Laurence and Ritchie Robertson (eds.), Isaiah Berlin and the Enlightenment, Oxford: Oxford University Press, 2016.
 Caute, David, Isaac and Isaiah: The Covert Punishment of a Cold War Heretic (Yale University Press, 2013)
 Cherniss, Joshua, and Steven Smith, eds. The Cambridge Companion to Isaiah Berlin (Cambridge University Press, 2018). excerpt
 Crowder, George. Isaiah Berlin: Liberty and Pluralism, Cambridge: Polity Press, 2004. .
 Crowder, George. The Problem of Value Pluralism: Isaiah Berlin and Beyond  (Routledge, 2019)
 Dubnov, Arie M. Isaiah Berlin: The Journey of a Jewish Liberal (Palgrave Macmillan, 2012).
 Galipeau, Claude. Isaiah Berlin's Liberalism, Oxford: Clarendon Press, 1994. .
 Gray, John. Isaiah Berlin: An Interpretation of His Thought, (Princeton University Press, 1996). .
 Hardy, Henry, ed. The Book of Isaiah: Personal Impressions of Isaiah Berlin  (The Boydell Press, 2009).
 Ignatieff, Michael. Isaiah Berlin: A Life (Chatto and Windus, 1998)
 Lyons, Johnny. The Philosophy of Isaiah Berlin (Bloomsbury Publishing, 2020). excerpt
 Müller, Jan-Werner, ed. Isaiah Berlin’s Cold War Liberalism (Springer, 2019).
 Walicki, Andrzej. Encounters with Isaiah Berlin: Story of an Intellectual Friendship (Peter Lang, 2011).

Tributes, obituaries, articles and profiles
 Sir Isaiah Berlin – May He Rest in Peace.
 A tribute to Isaiah Berlin & A conversation with Isaiah Berlin on The Philosopher's Zone, ABC, 6 & 13 June 2009.
 Isaiah Berlin and the history of ideas.
 The Isaiah Berlin Virtual Library, Wolfson College, Oxford.
 A podcast interview with Henry Hardy on Berlin's pluralism.
 A recording of the last of Berlin's Mellon Lectures, Wolfson College, Oxford.
 Biographical information on Sir Isaiah Berlin.
 A section from the last essay written by Isaiah Berlin, The New York Review of Books, Vol. XLV, Number 8 (1998).
 Ned O'Gorman, 'My dinners with Isaiah: the music of a philosopher's life – Sir Isaiah Berlin' – includes related article on Isaiah Berlin's commitment to ideals of genuine understanding over intellectual mastery, Commonweal, 14 August 1998.
 Tribute from the Chief Rabbi at his funeral.
 Anecdote from Wolfson College's tribute page.
 Hywel Williams: An English liberal stooge.
 Letter to Berlin from Tony Blair, 23 October 1997.
 Assaf Inbari, "The Spectacles of Isaiah Berlin", Azure (Spring 2006).
 Obituary by Henry Hardy.
 Joshua Cherniss, 'Isaiah Berlin: A Defence', in the Oxonian Review Joshua Cherniss, 'Freedom and Philosophers', review of Freedom and its Betrayal in the Oxonian Review Isaiah Berlin, Beyond the Wit, Evan R. Goldstein.
 Berlin archive and author page from The New York Review of Books''.

External links

 Website and bibliography of Isaiah Berlin's writings
 Full text of Concepts and Categories 
 Entry on Isaiah Berlin in the International Encyclopedia of Ethics
 
 Bibliography at Wolfson College
 , including a discussion with Michael Ignatieff, biographer, of the ideas of Berlin, a year after the latter's death
 Sir Isaiah Berlin's Blue Plaque on Headington House
 Isaiah Berlin Day in Riga
 Broadcasts

 
1909 births
1997 deaths
People from the Governorate of Livonia
Latvian Jews
Latvian emigrants to the United Kingdom
Emigrants from the Russian Empire to the United Kingdom
Alumni of Corpus Christi College, Oxford
Analytic philosophers
Social philosophers
Historians of political thought
British agnostics
British political philosophers
Fellows of All Souls College, Oxford
Fellows of the American Academy of Arts and Sciences
Fellows of the British Academy
Jewish agnostics
Jewish historians
Jewish philosophers
Liberalism
Knights Bachelor
Members of the Order of Merit
Commanders of the Order of the British Empire
Naturalised citizens of the United Kingdom
People educated at St Paul's School, London
Presidents of the British Academy
Presidents of Wolfson College, Oxford
Refugees in the United Kingdom
Scholars of Marxism
Slavists
British social liberals
Chichele Professors of Social and Political Theory
Jerusalem Prize recipients
Presidents of the Aristotelian Society
British Jews
Giambattista Vico scholars
20th-century English historians
British social commentators
People from Headington
Members of the American Philosophical Society
Burials at Wolvercote Cemetery